Policy laundering is the disguising of the origins of political decisions, laws, or international treaties. The term is based on the similar money laundering.

Hiding responsibility for a policy or decision 

One common method for policy laundering is the use of international treaties which are formulated in secrecy. Afterwards it is not possible to find out who advocated for which part of the treaty. Each person can claim that it was not them who demanded a certain paragraph but that they had to agree to the overall "compromise".

Examples that could be considered as "policy laundering" are WIPO or the Anti-Counterfeiting Trade Agreement (ACTA).

Circumventing the regular approval process 

Yet another manifestation of policy laundering is to implement legal policy which a subset of legislators desire but would normally not be able to obtain approval through regular means.

It has been suggested that policy laundering has become common political practice in areas related to terrorism and the erosion of civil liberties.

See also 

International law:
 Diplomacy
 Harmonisation of law
 International relations
 Investor-state dispute settlement

Political communication:
Astroturfing
Covert operation
Doublespeak
Media influence
War on Terror

Policy making:
Joint decision trap
Lobbyism
Participation (decision making)
Political corruption
Theories of political behaviour

References

External links 
 Privacy International: Policy Laundering
 openrightsgroup: Policy Laundering

International relations terminology
Global politics
Public policy